is a Japanese politician of the Liberal Democratic Party, a member of the House of Representatives in the Diet (national legislature). A native of Karatsu, Saga and graduate of the University of Tokyo she was elected to the House of Representatives for the first time in 2005.  She represented the 3rd District of Saga prefecture from 2005 until 2009.

References 
 

Members of the House of Representatives (Japan)
Female members of the House of Representatives (Japan)
Koizumi Children
Japanese accountants
University of Tokyo alumni
People from Saga Prefecture
Living people
1953 births
Liberal Democratic Party (Japan) politicians
21st-century Japanese women politicians